SkullGang is an American hip hop collective formed in 2007, by Harlem rapper Juelz Santana. The group is best known for their projects Juelz Santana Presents Skull Gang: Takeover (2008) and Jim Jones & Skull Gang Present a Tribute to Bad Santa (2008). Skull Gang released their debut album, entitled Skull Gang, on May 5, 2009. The group as a whole is signed to Skull Gang Entertainment and E1 Entertainment. The "skull" in Skull Gang is an acronym which stands for "Street Kids United by Loyalty & Loot".

Discography

Studio albums

Compilation albums

Mixtapes

Singles

References

Hip hop collectives
Hip hop groups from New York City
Musical groups established in 2007